Polio is the common name of poliomyelitis, an acute clinical disease caused by a poliovirus. Polio (also Polios) may also refer to:

Polio-related terms
Poliovirus, the virus that causes poliomyelitis
Post-polio syndrome, long term complication of poliomyelitis
Polio vaccine, a vaccine that induces immunity to one or more types of poliovirus

See also
Polioencephalomalacia, neurological disease in ruminants, caused by disrupted thiamine production in the body, not related to polioviruses